Amauromyza is a genus of leaf miner flies in the family Agromyzidae. There are more than sixty described species in Amauromyza.

Species
These 66 species belong to the genus Amauromyza:

 Amauromyza abnormalis (Malloch, 1913)
 Amauromyza acuta Sasakawa & Fan, 1985
 Amauromyza albidohalterata (Malloch, 1916)
 Amauromyza aliena Malloch, 1914
 Amauromyza angulicornis Zlobin, 1997
 Amauromyza anomala Spencer, 1981
 Amauromyza auriceps (Melander, 1913)
 Amauromyza balcanica Hendel, 1931
 Amauromyza belamcandae Sasakawa, 1981
 Amauromyza bifida Sasakawa & Fan, 1985
 Amauromyza boliviensis Sasakawa, 1992
 Amauromyza caliginosa Spencer, 1963
 Amauromyza carlinae Hering, 1944
 Amauromyza chamaebalani Hering, 1960
 Amauromyza chenopodivora Spencer, 1971
 Amauromyza clinopodii Sasakawa, 1998
 Amauromyza confondata Spencer, 1986
 Amauromyza elaeagni Rohdendorf-Holmanova, 1959
 Amauromyza elsinorensis Spencer, 1981
 Amauromyza flavida Spencer, 1975
 Amauromyza flavifrons (Meigen, 1830)
 Amauromyza fraxini (Beiger, 1980)
 Amauromyza fuscibasis Malloch, 1934
 Amauromyza gigantissima Spencer, 1959
 Amauromyza gyrans (Fallen, 1823)
 Amauromyza indecisa (Malloch, 1913)
 Amauromyza insularis Spencer, 1981
 Amauromyza karli (Hendel, 1927)
 Amauromyza knowltoni Spencer, 1986
 Amauromyza labiatarum Hendel, 1920
 Amauromyza lamii (Kaltenbach, 1858)
 Amauromyza lathyroides Spencer, 1981
 Amauromyza leonuri Spencer, 1971
 Amauromyza lucens Spencer, 1981
 Amauromyza luteiceps Hendel, 1920
 Amauromyza maculosa (Malloch, 1913)
 Amauromyza madrilena Spencer, 1957
 Amauromyza maltensis Cerny, 2004
 Amauromyza meridionalis Spencer, 1975
 Amauromyza mihalyii Spencer, 1971
 Amauromyza monfalconensis (Strobl, 1909)
 Amauromyza morionella Zetterstedt, 1848
 Amauromyza nevadensis Spencer, 1981
 Amauromyza nigripennis (Sasakawa, 1961)
 Amauromyza nipponensis (Sasakawa, 1955)
 Amauromyza obscura (Rohdendorf-Holmanova, 1959)
 Amauromyza obscuripennis (Strobl, 1906)
 Amauromyza papuensis Spencer, 1966
 Amauromyza plectranthi (Sasakawa, 1961)
 Amauromyza pleuralis (Malloch, 1914)
 Amauromyza pterocaula Valladares, 1998
 Amauromyza queenslandica Spencer, 1977
 Amauromyza ranchograndensis Spencer, 1973
 Amauromyza remus Spencer, 1981
 Amauromyza riparia Sehgal, 1971
 Amauromyza romulus Spencer, 1981
 Amauromyza schusteri Spencer, 1981
 Amauromyza scleritica Spencer, 1981
 Amauromyza sheperdiae
 Amauromyza shepherdiae (Sehgal, 1971)
 Amauromyza soosi Zlobin, 1985
 Amauromyza stroblii Hendel, 1920
 Amauromyza subinfumata (Malloch, 1915)
 Amauromyza triseta Spencer, 1959
 Amauromyza verbasci (Bouché, 1847)
 Dizygomyza errans Meigen

References

Further reading

 
 

Agromyzidae
Articles created by Qbugbot
Opomyzoidea genera
Taxa named by Friedrich Georg Hendel